Larraín or Larrain is a surname of Basque origin.

Geographical distribution
As of 2014, 71.1% of all known bearers of the surname Larraín were residents of Chile (frequency 1:4,907), 12.1% of Peru (1:52,191), 6.0% of Argentina (1:140,143), 4.4% of the United States (1:1,627,258), 1.2% of Venezuela (1:487,166) and 1.2% of Spain (1:789,657).

In Spain, the frequency of the surname was higher than national average (1:789,657) in the following autonomous communities:
 1. Balearic Islands (1:182,486)
 2. Basque Country (1:240,098)
 3. Community of Madrid (1:400,415)
 4. Andalusia (1:489,591)
 5. Navarre (1:636,611)
 6. Catalonia (1:745,221)

In Chile, the frequency of the surname was higher than national average (1:4,907) in only one region: 
 1. Santiago Metropolitan Region (1:2,720)

People
Carlos Larraín, a Chilean lawyer and politician.
Fernando Larraín, a Chilean television actor, comedian
Felipe Larraín, a Chilean economist
Gabriel Larraín Valdivieso, a Chilean Catholic bishop
Gilles Larrain, an American photographer
Hernán Larraín, a Chilean politician
Joaquín Larraín Gandarillas, a Chilean priest
Luis Alfonzo Larrain, a Venezuelan composer
María Eugenia Larraín, a Chilean female model
Nicolás Larraín, a Chilean television presenter
Patricia Larraín, a Chilean actress and TV hostess
Sara Larraín, a Chilean politician and environmentalist
Teresa Larraín, a Chilean First Lady
Julita Astaburuaga Larraín, a Chilean socialite
Emiliano Figueroa Larraín, President of Chile in 1925-1927
Joaquín Figueroa Larraín, a Chilean politician
Juan Francisco Fresno Larraín, a Chilean cardinal
Arturo Matte Larraín, a Chilean lawyer and politician
Eliodoro Matte Larraín, President of conservative and influential think-tank Public Studies Center (Centro de Estudios Públicos, CEP)
María Patricia Matte Larraín, President of the Primary Instruction Society, owner of several schools for poor children in Santiago
Claudio Orrego Larraín, a Chilean lawyer and politician
María José Prieto Larraín, a Chilean actress
Francisco Ramón Vicuña Larraín, a President of Chile in 1829
Adolfo Zaldívar Larraín, a Chilean politician and lawyer
Andrés Zaldívar Larraín, a Chilean Christian Democrat politician
Lasco James Larrain, son of Gilles Larrain
Manuel Gerardo, Marquis de Larrain, a Chilean-Canadian artist and the titular 52nd Prince of Tyrone (See also O'Neills of Tyrone)
Martin Larrain, son of Carlos Larrain, that killed Hernan Canales while driving under the influence, in September 2013.

See also
Larraín family, a prominent Chilean family.
Larraín Alcalde, a settlement in Pichilemu, Chile

References

Basque-language surnames